Susan Margaret Pond  is an Australian scientist and technologist, active in business and academia, and recognised for her contributions to medicine, biotechnology, renewable energy and sustainability. She is the current president of the Royal Society of New South Wales.

Early life and education 

Born in Sydney, Susan Pond qualified in medicine at the University of Sydney, receiving the Bachelor of Medicine and Bachelor of Surgery degrees in 1969. She then undertook postgraduate study at the University of New South Wales, where she was awarded the Doctor of Medicine degree and at the University of Queensland, where she was awarded the Doctor of Science degree.

Career 

Susan Pond was the first woman to be appointed to a Personal Professorial Chair in the Department of Medicine at the University of Queensland, the first woman to receive the Wellcome Australia Medal, and the first female Managing Director of a Johnson & Johnson Company in Australia. From February 2017 to May 2018 she was the director of Sydney Nano (The University of Sydney Nano Institute) and she is currently Chair of the NSW Smart Sensing Network (NSSN).

From 1994 to 1996 she served as chairman of the Australian Drug Evaluation Committee.

From 2010 to 2014 she served as a director of the Australian Nuclear Science and Technology Organisation.

Previous positions have included: adjunct professor, faculty of engineering and information technologies, University of Sydney; Chairman & Managing Director of Johnson & Johnson Research Pty Limited; Adjunct Professor in sustainability, United States Studies Centre at the University of Sydney; Professor of Medicine at the University of Queensland  1984–1996.

Distinctions and awards 

Susan Pond is a Fellow of the Royal Society of New South Wales, of the Australian Academy of Technological Sciences and Engineering, of the Australian Academy of Health and Medical Sciences, of the Royal Australasian College of Physicians, and of the Australian Institute of Company Directors.

She was made a Member of the Order of Australia in the 1994 Australia Day Honours for services to Clinical Pharmacology and Toxicology and in 2001 she was awarded a Centenary Medal for service to Australian society in therapeutics.

In 2013 she was awarded the Doctor of Medicine degree honoris causa by the University of Queensland and in the same year she was named as one of Australia's Top 100 Women of Influence by The Australian Financial Review.

Pond served as Vice President of the Australian Academy of Technological Sciences and Engineering, and Chair of the Clean Technology committee.

In April 2021 Pond was elected President of the Royal Society of New South Wales, only the third woman to be elected to the post.

References

External links
Prof Susan Pond, ATSE Workshop August 2011, pg.42

Members of the Order of Australia
Fellows of the Australian Academy of Technological Sciences and Engineering
Fellows of the Australian Academy of Health and Medical Sciences
Fellows of the Australian Institute of Company Directors
Fellows of the Royal Australasian College of Physicians
Living people
Academic staff of the University of Queensland
Year of birth missing (living people)
Fellows of the Royal Society of New South Wales